In enzymology, a N-hydroxyarylamine O-acetyltransferase is an enzyme that catalyzes the chemical reaction

acetyl-CoA + an N-hydroxyarylamine  CoA + an N-acetoxyarylamine

Thus, the two substrates of this enzyme are acetyl-CoA and N-hydroxyarylamine, whereas its two products are CoA and N-acetoxyarylamine.

This enzyme belongs to the family of transferases, specifically those acyltransferases transferring groups other than aminoacyl groups.  The systematic name of this enzyme class is acetyl-CoA:N-hydroxyarylamine O-acetyltransferase. Other names in common use include arylhydroxamate N,O-acetyltransferase, arylamine N-acetyltransferase, and N-hydroxy-2-aminofluorene-O-acetyltransferase.

Structural studies

As of late 2007, only one structure has been solved for this class of enzymes, with the PDB accession code .

References

 

EC 2.3.1
Enzymes of known structure